John Patrick "Pat" Woods (born 1948 or 1949) is an American politician and a Republican member of the New Mexico Senate representing District 7. He was appointed on October 25, 2012  by Governor of New Mexico Susana Martinez to fill the vacancy caused by the resignation of Senator Clinton Harden.

Education
Woods earned his BS in agricultural economics and business administration from New Mexico State University.

Elections
 2012 When District 7 incumbent Republican Senator Harden retired and left the seat open, Woods ran in the three-way June 5, 2012 Republican Primary, winning with 2,296 votes (52%) and was unopposed for the November 6, 2012 General election, winning with 12,595 votes.

Controversy 
In August 2020, a rally held at Albuquerque claiming to honor the far-right militia group New Mexico Civil Guard was attended by some Republicans. Woods described the rally as a "GOP grand opening event, paying special tribute to NM law enforcement and the New Mexico Civil Guard."

References

External links
 Official page at the New Mexico Legislature
 Campaign site
 
 Pat Woods at Ballotpedia
 John Patrick Woods at the National Institute on Money in State Politics

Place of birth missing (living people)
1940s births
Living people
Republican Party New Mexico state senators
New Mexico State University alumni
21st-century American politicians